The Federal Service for Veterinary and Phytosanitary Supervision (Rosselkhoznadzor) is a federal body that exercises oversight over veterinary medicine and agricultural production and byproducts in the Russian Federation. It was formed on June 30, 2004 as part of Russia's Ministry of Agriculture.

References

External links 
 Official website 

2004 establishments in Russia
Government agencies established in 2004
Government agencies of Russia